Redoubt Peak is a  mountain summit located on the shared border of Jasper National Park in Alberta, and Mount Robson Provincial Park in British Columbia, Canada. Redoubt Peak is part of The Ramparts in the Canadian Rockies. It was named in 1920 because it has an appearance similar to that of a redoubt on a castle. Its nearest higher peak is Dungeon Peak,  to the southeast.

History
The first ascent was made in 1927 by F. H. Slark and F. Rutishauser, who both perished on the descent. Their summit record was found on the top the following summer (in 1928). The mountain's name became official in 1935 by the Geographical Names Board of Canada.

Climate
Based on the Köppen climate classification, Redoubt Peak is located in a subarctic climate zone with cold, snowy winters, and mild summers.

See also
 List of peaks on the British Columbia–Alberta border

References

External links
 Parks Canada web site: Jasper National Park
 Provincial Park web site: Mount Robson Provincial Park

Gallery

Three-thousanders of Alberta
Three-thousanders of British Columbia
Mountains of Jasper National Park
Mount Robson Provincial Park
Canadian Rockies